Endopeptidase-2 may refer to:
 Neprilysin, an enzyme
 Meprin A, an enzyme